McCreary Airport  is a registered aerodrome located adjacent to McCreary, Manitoba, Canada.

References

Registered aerodromes in Manitoba

Parkland Region, Manitoba